Singapore Armed Forces Long Service and Good Conduct Medal may refer to:

 Singapore Armed Forces Long Service and Good Conduct (20 Years) Medal
 Singapore Armed Forces Long Service and Good Conduct (10 Years) Medal